Dantrai, also known as Harni Dantrai, is a town in Reodar tehsil, Sirohi district, Rajasthan, India. The total geographical area of village is 2218 hectares.

Dantrai's dominance is in Hindu Rajput (Chauhan) hands, 
Several castes of the Hindu religion live in this town such as Rajpurohit, Rajput, Rawal, Suthar, Rao, Prajapat, Jain, and Agarwal.
The town has various temples of the Hindu and Jain communities.

The village is administrated by a sarpanch who is elected representative of the village by the local elections.

Nine hundred families reside in the town. Dantrai village has a population of 4585 of which 2367 are males while 2218 are females as per population census 2011.

Dantrai has one post office, Chowki (police station), hospital, and power house. The village is connected with Jalore - Reodar Highway. 

Dantrai has two secondary schools (separate for boys & girls). The village is also equipped with recreational centers.

Dantrai belongs to Jodhpur Division. It is located 45km towards west from District headquarters Sirohi, 14km from Reodar, and 481km from state capital Jaipur.

Dantrai's Pin code is 307512 and postal head office is Dantrai.

Many people from this town are successful businessmen in various parts of the country. Most of the people in Dantrai depend on agriculture.

The town is surrounded by the Aravalli Range, which separates it from the Thar Desert. The most famous temples are Jageshwar Mahadev, Paadru Dham, and Bhakarli Mahadeo.

Abu Road is nearest town to Dantrai for all major economic activities and is approximately 48km away.

References

Villages in Sirohi district